The 1959 Pepperdine Waves football team represented George Pepperdine College as an independent during the 1959 NCAA College Division football season. The team was led by fifth-year head coach John Scolinos. For the 1959 season, the Waves moved home games back to Sentinel Field on the campus of Inglewood High School in Inglewood, California. They had previously played at Sentinel Field in 1946, 1947, and 1949. Pepperdine finished the season with a record of 2–5–1.

Schedule

Notes

References

Pepperdine
Pepperdine Waves football seasons
Pepperdine Waves football